Kiryat Luza is a Samaritan village situated on Mount Gerizim near the city of Nablus in the West Bank. It is under the joint control of Israel and the Palestinian National Authority, and is the only remaining site populated wholly by Samaritans. Kiryat Luza is home to roughly half of the world's total Samaritan population, with the other half located in the Israeli city of Holon. The village is adjacent to the Jewish Israeli settlement of Har Brakha. Until the 1980s, most Samaritans in the West Bank resided in Nablus proper, below Mount Gerizim, and began to relocate to Kiryat Luza due to a spike in violence throughout Israel and the Palestinian Territories during the First Intifada; the Israeli military maintains an active presence in the area (see Israeli occupation of the West Bank).

References

Samaritans
Villages in the West Bank